The Gulf Coaster was a small children's roller coaster that was built for both the Great America parks. Gulf Coaster was built by the Allan Herschell Company with its trains made by Bradley and Kaye. It was a standard "Little Dipper" model. Today, neither of the Gulf Coasters operate.

Gurnee
The Gurnee version was plagued with problems in its only year (1976). The ride closed midway throughout the 1976 season due to several fires and was removed before 1977 and replaced by the Southern Cross skyride. The ride was most likely scrapped.

Santa Clara
The Santa Clara version managed to survive a few years later (mainly due to Santa Clara not getting a Southern Cross skyride). The ride was not as much of a fire hazard as its Gurnee cousin. The little Gulf Coaster made its last run at the end of the 1980 season. It too was most likely scrapped.

External links
 California's Great America Gulf Coaster at RCDB
 Six Flags Great America Gulf Coaster at RCDB

Six Flags Great America
California's Great America
Former roller coasters in Illinois
Former roller coasters in California